Królestwo is the fifth studio album by Polish heavy metal band Hunter. It was released on November 5, 2012, by Tune Project/Mystic Production.

A music videos have been made for the songs "Trumian Show", "PSI", both directed by Mateusz Winkiel and "O wolności" which consists live footage.

The album landed at number 4 on Polish Albums Chart, and dropped out two weeks later. On July 4, 2013, Królestwo was certified Gold in Poland for selling 15,000 copies.

Track listing

Credits

References 

2012 albums
Hunter (band) albums
Polish-language albums